The Ford Comète (later known as the Simca Comète) is a car that was built between 1951 and 1954 in France by Ford SAF.  Intended as the luxury model in the range, the Comète's bodywork was built by FACEL, who later produced the better-known Facel Vega luxury cars under their own name.  The original engine was a 2.2 L V8 produced by Ford SAF of French design, also used in the Ford Vedette, with a Pont-à-Mousson 4-speed manual transmission fitted.

The original model had a single horizontal bar across the grille with a chromed shield or bullet in the centre, somewhat similar to contemporary Studebaker products, among others, with steel wheels and chromed hubcaps.

More power for 1953
In October 1952, for the Paris Motor Show, the Comète appeared with an engine enlarged from 2,158 cc to 2,355 cc.   Claimed horse-power was raised from 68 hp to 80 hp indicating that there was more to the engine upgrade than simply an increase in the cylinder bore from 66.0 mm to 67.9 mm.  (The stroke remained unchanged at 81.3 mm.)   The most obvious of several other engine enhancements at this stage was the increase in the compression ratio from 6.8 : 1 to 7.4 : 1, reflecting the appearance of slightly higher octane fuels.   Torque and engine flexibility were also improved and the claimed top speed increased from 130 km/h (81 mph) to 145 km/h (90 mph).

Much more power available for 1954
Available from the start of 1954, a new "Monte-Carlo" model appeared with the 3,923 cc V8 engine normally fitted to Ford trucks; this engine, befitting its truck heritage, delivered 78 kW (105 hp) with plenty of torque. Performance was much improved, but the new engine did not endear itself to buyers of the car having a "truck engine", The engine's large displacement meant that its taxed horsepower rating imposed by the French government was 22CV, giving a high road tax in a country where government taxation policy, especially after 1948, was high for cars with engine sizes above 2 litres. This new model was fitted with wire wheels, a fake hood scoop, and a typical for the time Ford egg-crate grille, consisting of vertical and horizontal equally spaced bars.  The French called this grille a "coupe-frites": a "french-fry cutter".

Commercial
The Comète combined the elegant style of a body by Facel with the mechanical underpinnings of the Ford Vedette combined with a shortened wheelbase.   The rear seat was stylishly designed, especially on the upmarket "Monte-Carlo" version with its two-colour leather seat covers, but nevertheless offered insufficient leg space for adults, other than on the shortest and most unavoidable of journeys.   The economy was beginning to grow robustly by the mid-1950s, but the market capacity for cars of this size remained small and Comète sales were correspondingly modest. Above all, it was handicapped by a list price that was (in October 1953) 65% higher than that for the mechanically similar Vedette.   Customers interested in the larger engined 3,923 cc versions were faced with a price for the "Monte-Carlo" (once it became available at the start of 1954) that was 51% higher than that of the spacious four door Vendôme.

Change of manufacturer
During 1954, Ford SAF was sold, and the Comète's final year of production took place under Simca.  The Simca Comète Monte-Carlo continued to be offered till July 1955.

See also
1950 Ford
Ford Zephyr Mark I
Ford Taunus

References 
 Ford S.A.F. Ford Comète Brochure. Reproduced by Facel-Vega.com, retrieved April 30, 2005. (French language)
 Ford Oldtimer und Motorsport Club Cologne e.V. Ford Comète.  Retrieved April 30, 2005. (German language)

Comete
Facel Vega vehicles
Simca vehicles
Cars introduced in 1951